This is about the term and historiography. For history of the period see World War I, World War II, etc..
"Second Thirty Years' War" is a periodization scheme sometimes used to encompass the wars in Europe from 1914 to 1945.
Just as the Thirty Years' War of 1618 to 1648 was not a single war but a series of conflicts in varied times and locations, later organized and named by historians into a single period, the Second Thirty Years' War has been seen as a "European Civil War", fought over the problem of Germany and exacerbated by the new ideologies of fascism, Nazism and communism that came into power after World War I. The thesis of the Second Thirty Years' War is that World War I naturally led to World War II; in this framework, the latter is the inevitable result of the former, and thus they can be seen as a single conflict. Historians have criticized this thesis on the grounds that it excuses the actions of fascist and Nazi historical actors.

Origins 
The concept of a "Second Thirty Years' War" originated in 1946 with the former head of French government Charles de Gaulle in his speech in Bar-le-Duc (28 July 1946) evoking "the drama of the Thirty Years War we just won". De Gaulle viewed the First World War and the Second World War as a single conflict, the interwar period being a mere truce. That was echoed, among others, by Sigmund Neumann in his book The Future in Perspective (1946). In 1948, British Prime Minister Winston Churchill gave the idea a boost when, in the first paragraph of the preface to The Gathering Storm (1948), he wrote that his books would "cover an account of another Thirty Years War". Major European conflicts during that period included the Balkan Wars (1912–13), World War I (1914–18), the Russian Civil War (1917–23), the Ukrainian–Soviet War (1917–21), the Polish–Soviet War (1919–21), the Spanish Civil War (1936–39) and World War II (1939–45). In addition, the interwar period saw significant levels of civilian and labor conflict as well as colonial wars.

Criticism 
The thesis has been challenged and rejected by many historians, who see it as too simple an explanation for the complex series of events that occurred during the interwar period of 1918 to 1939. In particular, some argue that, in describing the rise of the Nazis as an inevitable result of the treaty of Versailles, the "Second Thirty Years' War" thesis excuses Nazi rhetoric as being a defensive reaction to supposed British and French vindictiveness. Rather, critics see World War II as a consequence of Hitler and the racist ideology of Nazism, and since Hitler's rise to power was contingent on the Great Depression, it cannot have been inevitable, nor can his support have been a direct reaction to Versailles. The Second Thirty Years' War thesis is part of the larger debates over the causes of World War II and over the idea of a European Civil War.

See also 

 Long War (20th century)
 World war
 Political history of the world

Notes

References

Sources

Further reading 

 
 
 
 
 
 McLeod, Tyler (2019). World War 1914-1945: A Second Thirty Years' War
 
 
 Winter, Jay (2015). The Thirty Years’ War (1914-1945)

Late modern Europe
Historical eras
20th century in Europe